The House of Monpezat is a French old bourgeois family from the Province of Béarn associated with the Danish Royal Family by marriage after 1967, when Henri de Laborde de Monpezat wed Princess Margrethe of Denmark, then the heir presumptive of the ruling House of Glücksburg, and as of 1972 is the Queen of Denmark.

Its members owned three homes and farms in Monpezat and Beaufranc in Béarn that were declared "noble lands" by letters of 1655, but the Laborde family was denied twice in 1703 and 1707 to be admitted with the nobility at the Estates of Béarn. Admission into the Estates of Béarn was a necessary condition to be recognized as noble in Béarn.

Most recent reference authors, specialists of the French nobility, do not consider that the Laborde de Monpezat family belongs to the French nobility.

Family background
The Labordes were a well-to-do family of the middle-class originating from the region of Béarn in southwestern France which took the name Laborde de Monpezat, following the marriage of Jean Laborde to Catherine d'Arricau, dame de Monpezat on 16 August 1648.

In May 1655 Jean de Laborde, medical doctor, received letters patent which elevated three houses and farms in Monpezat and Beaufranc as "noble lands", but the family's recognition as noble depended legally on the Estates of Béarn which, in 1703 and again in 1707, rejected the Laborde de Monpezat petition to be admitted with the nobility in the Estates of Béarn. The reception into the Estates of Béarn was required to be recognized as noble in Béarn. On 11 July 1672 The Estates of Béarn condemned a person who called himself noble before his reception.

Not all feudal or noble lands allowed to be admitted into the Estates of Béarn in the order of the nobility: only the baronies, the lordships with middle and low justice and "domenjadures" (lordship with the right to be admitted into the Estates of Béarn) had this right. There is no official record which stipulates that in the letters of 1655 the "nobles lands" of the Laborde family were erected as "domenjadure". The original letters patent have not been found and their recording has not been found, either.

Nonetheless, the family survived the French Revolution under the name of Laborde de Monpezat. By a decree of the Third cabinet of Napoleon III, the family's requests to legally change their surname to de Laborde-Monpezat (on 14 July 1860) and then to de Laborde de Monpezat (on 19 May 1861) were granted. Under the present form of the name, the family supplied a mayor to the town of Pau in 1875 (Aristide de Laborde de Monpezat, b. 1830 – d. 1888, great grandfather of Prince Henrik).

Since late in the nineteenth century, some members of the de Laborde de Monpezat family bear the courtesy title of  "count", which had to be assumed, properly on a traditional basis, only by untitled genuine nobles.

Neither the nobility of the family nor this French title of "count" are acknowledged as historically and legally valid by the Encyclopédie de la fausse noblesse et de la noblesse d'apparence (Pierre-Marie Dioudonnat, Paris, 1976–1979), nor did Régis Valette include the family in his Catalogue de la noblesse française (2002). Charondas describes in his book A quel titre (volume 37, 1970) the de Laborde de Monpezat as "false nobles, low folk in the 17th century, not received in the states of Béarn due to 'alleged nobility,' and as having never had nobility in their family."

Danish titles

Danish law never officially required that royal spouses be of aristocratic origin. Nonetheless, no prince's marriage to a person who lacked male-line descent from royalty or titled nobility had been accepted as dynastic by the sovereign in the course of Denmark's history as a hereditary monarchy prior to Hereditary Princess Margrethe's marriage in June 1967. From the date of that marriage "Count" Henri de Laborde de Monpezat was designated Prince Henrik. In 2005, his wife having reigned as Queen Margrethe II since 1972, Henrik was officially declared Denmark's Prince Consort.

On 30 April 2008, the title "Count of Monpezat" (greve af Monpezat), was conferred by the Queen on both of her sons and made hereditary for their descendants in the male-line, for both males and females. The Queen's Private Secretary Henning Fode commented, "The Queen and the Prince Consort have considered this for quite some time, and it has led to the belief that it was the right thing to do." There was not an official publication of the grant, only a press release and a rescript were personally given.

In fact, Henrik had mentioned the possibility of associating his family name with that of his royal descendants as long ago as 1996, stating in his published memoir, "During our generation the future sovereign will perhaps receive approval to see 'Monpezat' added to the dynastic name of Oldenburg-Glücksborg". While being interviewed by the French weekly Point de Vue in October 2005, Henrik raised the issue shortly after the birth of Crown Prince Frederick's firstborn child, Prince Christian, who is expected to inherit the Danish crown eventually: "It also makes him very proud and happy that Monpezat will be added to this small grandson's future name as Prince of Denmark. 'It is a great joy for me that his French roots will also be remembered.'" Although no announcement was made at that time, Prince Christian does now include (part of) his French grandfather's surname among his hereditary titles. The grant does not extend this Danish comital title to Henrik himself, however. Nor has the Danish Crown issued a proclamation or statement indicating the name that the royal dynasty will bear after Queen Margrethe's reign (in accordance with tradition, she reigns as a member of her father's dynasty, the House of Glücksburg).

Prince Joachim and his descendants now bear a coat-of-arms differenced from those of Denmark's royal shield of arms with Prince Joachim's arms featuring an inescutcheon impaled between the arms of Oldenburg and Monpezat, the arms crowned with a coronet of a prince of Denmark. Crown Prince Frederik's arms are, except for its use of the coronet of the Crown Prince of Denmark, identical to his mother's arms with the Oldenburg inescutcheon.

Denmark

Family tree 
Jean Laborde, ca. 1620 - ????
Paul Laborde de Monpezat, 1672 - ????
Louis Laborde de Monpezat, 1711–1761
Antoine Laborde de Monpezat, 1743–1787
Jean de Laborde de Monpezat, 1786–1863 (The Laborde de Monpezat family requested to legally change their surname from Laborde de Monpezat to de Laborde-Monpezat in 1860, and to de Laborde de Monpezat in 1861)
Aristide de Laborde de Monpezat, 1830–1888
Henri de Laborde de Monpezat, 1868–1929
André de Laborde de Monpezat, 1907–1998
Henrik, Prince Consort of Denmark, 1934–2018
Frederik, Crown Prince of Denmark, Count of Monpezat, born 1968
Prince Christian of Denmark, Count of Monpezat, born 2005

Bibliography
Pierre-Marie Dioudonnat, Encyclopédie de la fausse noblesse et de la noblesse d'apparence, 4 vol., Sedopols, Paris, (1976-1997).
Régis Valette, Catalogue de la noblesse française (2002)
Joseph Valynseele, Les Laborde de Monpezat et leurs alliances, Paris, 368 pages, 1975

Notes

External Articles
 Statistics from INSEE relating to the name  Laborde de Monpezat supplied by Géopatronyme (French)
 Statistics from INSEE relating to the name  Laborde de Montpezat (variant with a t) supplied by Géopatronyme (French)

 
17th-century establishments in France